"Splash Gold —Natsu no Kiseki— / Prism of Eyes" is MAX's 30th single under the Sonic Groove label. It was released on August 2, 2006, and was their first single to be released as a CD single and CD+DVD single. "Splash Gold -Natsu no Kiseki-" is a mid-tempo pop song with Okinawan folk influences. "Prism of Eyes" was used as the ending theme to Tokusatsu series Madan Senki Ryukendo for episodes 30–39 and is in the style of music used regularly in such programming. It is the last single to feature vocals from former member Aki, before she left the group on August 31, 2008.

Tentative track listing

CD

DVD

Charts
Oricon Sales Chart (Japan)

2006 singles
MAX (band) songs